Vox (Latin for "voice", often stylized as VOX) is a national-conservative political party in Spain. Founded in 2013, it is currently led by party president Santiago Abascal, vice presidents Jorge Buxadé, Javier Ortega Smith, Reyes Romero, and secretary general Ignacio Garriga. Vox is identified as right-wing to far-right by academics and mainstream journalists.

The party entered the Spanish parliament for the first time in the April 2019 general election, and became the country's third-largest political force after the November 2019 Spanish general election, in which it secured 3.6 million votes and 52 seats in the Congress of Deputies. Its public support is on the rise, according to results of subsequent regional elections, and opinion polls.

History

Origins 

Vox was founded on 17 December 2013, and publicly launched at a press conference in Madrid on 16 January 2014 as a split from the People's Party (PP). This schism was interpreted as an offshoot of "neoconservative" or "social conservative" PP party members. The party platform sought to rewrite the constitution to abolish regional autonomy and parliaments. Several of their promoters (for example: Alejo Vidal-Quadras, José Antonio Ortega Lara, and Santiago Abascal) had been members of the platform "reconversion.es" that issued a manifesto in 2012 vouching for the recentralization of the State. Vidal-Quadras was proclaimed as the first chairman in March 2014.

The initial funding, totalling nearly 972,000 euros, came from individual money transfers by supporters of the National Council of Resistance of Iran (NCRI) and People's Mujahedin of Iran (MEK), thanks to their "personal relationship" with Vidal-Quadras, who had supported NCRI throughout his stint in the EU Parliament until 2014. There is no evidence that Vox has broken Spanish or EU funding rules accepting these donations.

Vox ran for the first time in the 2014 European elections but narrowly failed to win a seat in the European Parliament.

In September 2014, the party elected Santiago Abascal, one of the founders, as new President, and Iván Espinosa de los Monteros, also a founder, as General Secretary. Eleven members of the National Executive Committee were also elected.

The party participated in the 2015 and the 2016 elections, but did not do well, scoring 0.23% and 0.20% of votes respectively.

After the Catalan referendum of 2017 and the start of a Spanish constitutional crisis, Vox opted to not participate in the Catalan regional elections of 2017. After the Catalan declaration of independence, the party sued the Parliament of Catalonia and several independentist politicians the number of its members increased by 20% in forty days.

Entrance into institutions 
On 10 September 2018, Vox enlisted an independent legislator in the regional parliament of Extremadura (who had dropped out of the PP parliamentary group) as party member. On 2 December 2018, they won 12 parliamentary seats in the Andalusian regional election,  entering a regional parliament for the first time. It supported the coalition regional government by Ciudadanos and the Popular Party. With this result, Vox was also given a first seat in the Senate of Spain, which was taken by Francisco José Alcaraz.

The party obtained 10.26% of votes in the April 2019 general election, electing 24 Deputies and entering the Congress of Deputies for the first time. Later, the party entered the European Parliament for the first time with 6.2% of the votes and three Eurodeputies, which after Brexit became four. After this election, the party joined the European Conservatives and Reformists group and the Alliance of Conservatives and Reformists in Europe. In the second general election of the year in November, Vox came third and increased its number of deputies from 24 to 52. It was the most-voted party in the Region of Murcia and the autonomous city of Ceuta.

At the beginning of 2020, during the onset of the global COVID-19 pandemic, Vox called for travel restrictions between China and Spain, and later between Italy and Spain, to safeguard against the "Chinese virus". At that time the epidemic was already in full swing in those countries, but it was prior to any COVID cases being officially confirmed within Spain in significant numbers. That position found no support among other parties, and it was criticized as xenophobic rhetoric. The party claims that serious counter-COVID measures were deliberately delayed in Spain by the government, which hid the information and downplayed known risks to allow for mass public events on International Women's Day (8 March) to take place, as these events were important for the left wing agenda of the newly formed coalition government of PSOE and UP. At the same time, Vox went forward with their own global party conference on 8 March in Vistalegre, where party supporters from all parts of Spain were invited. The conference resulted in numerous cases of COVID infection, including confirmed cases of COVID transmission between members of Vox leadership. This fact was often brought up by Vox opponents to criticize Vox attitude towards COVID situation in Spain.

During the anti-COVID lockdown and follow-up restrictions, Vox routinely criticized government measures as inefficient, partisan, and partially unconstitutional. In April 2020 the party appealed to the Constitutional Court of Spain against the first State of Alarm (15 March – 21 June) declared by the government. In October 2020, Vox's parliamentary group at the Congress of Deputies tabled a motion of no confidence against the current Prime Minister Pedro Sánchez, bringing Santiago Abascal as alternative candidate. The motion failed to gain any support among the other parliamentary groups, gathering 52 'yes' votes (those of Vox legislators) and 298 'no' votes (the rest of the chamber). In November 2020 Vox appealed to the Constitutional Court of Spain against the second State of Alarm (October 25, 2020 – May 9, 2021) declared by the government.

In the face of the 2020 United States presidential election, Vox was fully supportive of President Donald Trump's candidacy, even tweeting from its official account that Joe Biden was the preferred candidate of "El País, Podemos, Otegi, Maduro, China, Iran and pedophiles", which according to the international news agency EFE was echoing QAnon conspiracy theories. Vox took part in the 2021 CPAC conference and refused to acknowledge Biden's victory.

At the beginning of 2021, Vox's abstention was instrumental in securing European COVID-recovery funds on socialist terms, criticized by independent experts for allowing the government inefficient partisan spending without any effective independent control. Many Vox supporters considered this as the "largest error in Vox's history", leading to party leaders admitting it as a mistake and apologizing.

During 2020 and 2021 electoral campaigns for regional elections in the Basque Country, Catalonia, and the Community of Madrid multiple legal electoral events of Vox were physically attacked by radical political opponents on the premises of "Vox's legitimate electoral events in some regions being provocative acts". The view of the events as provocations was endorsed by high ranking UP members, including their speaker Pablo Echenique, and their leader, the Second Deputy Prime Minister of Spain at the time, Pablo Iglesias.

On 14 July 2021, in response to the Vox's appeal the previous year, the Constitutional Court of Spain declared by a narrow majority (6 votes in support vs. 5 votes against) that the first anti-COVID State of Alarm was unconstitutional in the part of suppressing the freedom of movement established by the Article 19 of the Constitution. In October 2021 the Constitutional Court of Spain supported two other appeals by Vox, and declared unconstitutional the closing down of Spanish Parliament and Senate in the beginning of pandemic, and the second State of Alarm. As reported on 22 October 2021, the Government of Spain ordered all fines collected in relation to the first State of Alarm to be returned to citizens.

On 13 February 2022 Vox came third in the 2022 Castilian-Leonese regional election, raising its representation from 1 up to 13 seats, and becoming the key player for the rival People's Party (PP), who won the elections, to form a government. Following this election result, and an unfolding leadership crisis in PP, Vox for the first time was recognized as the Spain's second political force, according to some opinion polls for the next general elections. In March 2022, it was announced that Vox would form government with the PP in Castile and León, taking three of ten ministerial positions including vice president for regional leader Juan García-Gallardo. Vox member Carlos Pollán was elected President of the Cortes of Castile and León, the position of speaker. This represents the first participation of Vox in any regional government.

On 19 June 2022 Vox came third in the 2022 Andalusian regional elections. With Macarena Olona as the leading candidate, the party improved over the previous regional elections, gaining about 100k more votes, and two more seats in the Parliament of Andalusia, but failed short of the expectations to achieve significantly better results and become the key to the new regional government. In the aftermath of elections, despite initial promises to stay and lead Vox's opposition group in Andalusia, on 29 July 2022 Olona announced her decision to resign and left politics due to unnamed "medical reasons".

Ideology 

The party sees itself as a more right-wing alternative to the centre-right People's Party, from which it split in 2013. This point of view is shared by some Spanish media, while some journalists and academics routinely describe it as a far-right party. Adding to the confusion is the exact understanding of the "far-right" term by different sources. While some of scholars cited below, who qualify Vox as a far-right or radical right party, make a clear fundamental distinction between "far-right", "radical right", and "extreme right", other sources and laymen often treat these terms as equivalent. As a young party, Vox somewhat lacks a well-elaborated ideology basis, and might still be considered as "a party under construction", subject to day-to-day ideology adjustments, further complicating its analysis.

According to the book by Rama, Zanotti, Turnbull-Dugarte, and Santana, Vox is a populist radical right party, in contrast to an extreme right. They view the party to be ideologically radical but not extreme since discursively it does not go against the central tenets of democracy. They write that "however, belonging to the populist radical right family means that the party communicates and advocates for policies that are somewhat at odds with some of the core principles of liberal democracy such as the rule of law, individual liberties or the rights of minorities." According to their analysis the central to Vox's ideology are: (i) a strong anti-immigration stance, and advocation for stricter law and order policies; (ii) a strong defence of the unity of Spain against all who allegedly want to break or undermine it; (iii) an opposition to what it labels as the "progressive dictatorship"; and strong defence of the Catholic religion and traditional moral values.

Carles Ferreira in his analysis comes to the conclusion that Vox is a far-right organization as it fits the characteristics of the radical right party family. He sums up: "Vox's ideology is based on a combination of nationalism and xenophobia (nativism) and an authoritarian view of society, attached to the values of law and order. This authoritarianism, however, represents neither the willingness to establish an autocratic regime nor the use of violence to reach political goals." According to Ferreira, the nationalism, nativism, authoritarianism, and traditionalism are central to Vox's ideology; the neoliberalism is present but not central; the populism is indicated, but not explicit; and there are no antidemocratic views in the party's ideology.

According to Xavier Casals the unifying part of Vox's ideology up to this point is a warlike ultranationalism, that is identified by the party with a palingenetic and biological vision of the country, the so-called España Viva, but also with a Catholic-inspired culture. He says that ideological roots of the party's ultranationalism lie in the incondicionalismo ("unconditionalism"), the nationalist discourse based on the "fear of amputation of the homeland" coined in the 19th century in Colonial Cuba against Cuban separatism and also autonomist concessions (replicated in Catalonia in the 1910s). Casals writes that their specific brand of Spanish nationalism is linked to the unconditional support to the State Security Forces and Corps, and the party's discourse has also revived the myth of the Antiespaña ("Anti-Spain"), an umbrella term created in the 1930s by the domestic ultranationalist forces to designate the (inner) "Enemies of Spain", creating a simplistic España viva/Antiespaña duality that comes handy for the communication in brief messages characteristic of social media. Casals notes regarding the external projection of their discourse that the party has reanimated the concept of "Hispanidad"; party leader Abascal has stated that an immigrant coming from a "brotherly Hispanic-American country" is not comparable to the immigration coming from "Islamic countries".

According to Guillermo Fernández Vázquez, Vox's discourse, which he described as "economically anti-statist and neoliberal" as well as "morally authoritarian", is similar to Jörg Haider's FPÖ or Jean Marie Le Pen's National Front from the 1980s, thus likening the emergence of the party to an archaic stage of current radical right parties, more worried about the need to modernize their image than Vox; the latter's approach to cultural issues would be in line with old school Spanish nationalist parties, restricting the scope of "culture" to "language and tradition".

Vox supports the State of Israel within the context of Israeli–Palestinian conflict. On the other hand, the party has appealed to conspiracy theories invoking the figure of George Soros as a mastermind behind Catalan separatism and the alleged "Islamization" of Europe. Support of anti-Soros conspiracy theories is widely considered as a sign of antisemitism, though leading figures of Vox never brought up the roots of Soros in their anti-Soros discourse. Vox used to feature some former neo-Nazis in party cadres and lists; some of them have been expelled from the party or have resigned. In November 2018, during a party event in Murcia, the party leader Santiago Abascal defined his party as "antifascist, anti-Nazi and anticommunist".

Internal politics 
Vox supports the constitutional monarchy, advocates for the recentralization of Spain by abolishing Spain's autonomous communities, and strongly opposes separatist movements in the country, in particular the Catalan independence movement and Basque nationalism. Fighting the latter one is also a personal question for multiple founding members, including the current president Santiago Abascal, whose family was threatened by the terrorist group ETA during his youth in the Basque country, José Antonio Ortega Lara who was kidnapped by ETA and kept hostage for 532 days and María Teresa López Álvarez whose father survived an assassination attempt by ETA. Vox promotes the illegalization of separatist parties in Spain, e.g. EH Bildu, ERC, etc., and opposed the pardoning of Catalan independence activists convicted for organizing an independence referendum. The party's centralist discourse incorporates economic arguments, claiming that current structure of autonomous and local governments in Spain are responsible for significant superfluous budget spending.

Vox publicly criticised and opposed the exhumation of Francisco Franco.

Vox calls for Spain to regain sovereignty over Gibraltar, and extra efforts for safeguarding Spanish control of Ceuta and Melilla.

Social issues 
Vox is considered anti-feminist by some, and wants to repeal the gender violence law, which they see as "discriminant against one of the sexes" and replace it with a "family violence law that will afford the same protection to the elderly, men, women and children who suffer from abuse". Left-leaning critics believe Vox undermines the importance of feminist struggle in the advance of liberties of women by means of linking the latter to a culture with "Christian foundations".

Vox is opposed to abortion rights. The party advocates for life sentences for sex offenders and abusers.

Vox opposes the legalization of euthanasia. The party supports bullfighting, which it considers an important element of Spanish culture that should be defended.

Islam 
While Vox's platform only espouses proposals against Islamic fundamentalism, the statements in the public sphere by party figures espouse a wider Islamophobia, helping to underpin, according to Casals, their discourse against Maghrebi immigration, the development of a closer bond to Catholicism. The party pleads for the closure of fundamentalist mosques as well as the arrest and expulsion of extremist imams. Vox has openly called for the deportation of tens of thousands of Muslims from Spain. In 2019, the party's leader demanded a Reconquista or reconquest of Spain, explicitly referencing a new expulsion of Muslim immigrants from the country.

LGBT rights 
Vox opposes same-sex marriage while supporting same-sex civil unions. The party has been accused of homophobia which the party denies. Party leader Santiago Abascal has denied allegations of homophobia, stating in an interview that Vox is in no way a homophobic party and that it merely opposes "LGBT ideology", going on to say that party membership includes many homosexuals, and that he personally has friends that are gay. José María Marco, Spanish essayist, liberal-conservative opinion journalist, and an open gay conservative contested the April 2019 Senate election in Madrid as the candidate from Vox, and also ran second in the party list for the 2019 Madrilenian regional election.

In some discourses, party leaders suggest that their opposition to mass immigration from Islamic countries effectively protects the LGBT community, as homosexuality is largely prosecuted in Islamic cultures, and most immigrants do not alter their attitude upon arrival to Spain.

Vox opposes Ley Trans, developed by Irene Montero and the Ministry of Equality, and approved by Spanish government in June 2021. According to Vox, the law as proposed "attacks the rights of women, children, biology, and common sense".

Vox congratulated the Hungarian parliament for passing legislation that would ban media and educational content which may be seen by underage persons from depicting LGBT individuals or addressing LGBT issues.

Multiple Vox politicians have made allegedly disparaging statements about homosexuals. Thus,  (ex-leader of Vox in Albacete, who left the party in 2019) told in 2013: "If I had a gay son I would help him, there are therapies to correct such psychology". Francisco Serrano Castro (ex-leader of Vox in Andalusia, who left the party in 2020) tweeted in 2017: "Homosexuals have penises and lesbians have vulvas, and don't be fooled, nobody cares about it". Juan E. Pflüger (director of communications of Vox in 2019) tweeted in 2013: "Why do gays celebrate Saint Valentine day, if their thing is not love, it's just vice".

Arms 
Vox has proposed that citizens should be allowed to keep arms at home, and supports the castle doctrine, but does not support the right to carry arms or the free sale of firearms. Current party leaders, Santiago Abascal and Javier Ortega, are both licensed to carry handguns for self-defence due to recurrent threats to their lives for their political activities. Under strict Spanish gun laws, such licenses are rarely granted to civilians, only when authorities consider proven a real high risk of an individual being attacked (about 0.02% of the Spanish population holds such licenses).

Economy 
Vox's economic position is often described as economically liberal or neo-liberal. The party defends liberalization of Spanish labour laws, lower taxation, and support for self-employed workers. Some public declarations of party members demonstrate understanding of emerging trends in modern economy; thus, Ivan Espinosa compared to dinosaurs many politicians who approach modern tax affairs the conservative way, willing to subdue to high taxation easily dislocatable cutting edge businesses. At the same time, Vox's discourse includes protectionist ideas for national companies, and criticism of globalization, and large multinational corporations, which can be viewed as anti-liberal.

The party's economic rhetoric includes elements aimed to attract the working class electorate, traditionally supportive of left-oriented parties, like PSOE. In 2020, Vox declared the launch of its own workers union named Solidaridad (Solidarity, the name reminiscent of numerous historic organizations in Spain, e.g. Solidaridad Española; and other countries, e.g. Polish Solidarity, UK Solidarity, etc.). According to some declarations, the union is just endorsed, but independent from Vox party.

Vox's discourse includes calls to cut inefficient and superfluous government spending. In particular, the costs associated with the administration of autonomous communities and local governments (which also should be downscaled according to the views of the party on internal politics), and "ideological chiringuitos", the party's label for various organizations, recipients of public funds, considered by Vox as just promotors of government agenda.

Immigration 
According to the party's platform, and numerous interviews of its leaders, Vox positions itself strongly against illegal immigration, which is a significant contributor to crime in Spain (in 2019, according to INE data, 25% of convicts in Spain were foreign nationals, 16% of convicts were non-European nationals; there is no official statistics on immigration status of foreign convicts). Vox calls for unconditional deportation of illegal immigrants; tightening of Spanish immigration laws; legal and police actions against non-profits (e.g. Proactiva Open Arms) and organized crime facilitating illegal immigration; and the militarization of problematic frontiers. The party emphasizes its support for legal immigration complied with the Spanish law. At the same time, they promote stricter regulation of immigration according to the needs of national economy; with preference for immigration from Hispanic cultures, on the premises of easier integration of such immigrants into Spanish society, compared to immigrants from Islamic countries.

During the Russian invasion of Ukraine, Vox supported the accommodation of Ukrainian refugees in Europe. According to Abascal "these are real war refugees, women, children, and elderly people", unlike "young Muslim males of military age invading Europe frontiers with intentions to destabilize and colonize it".

Opponents of Vox describe and criticize the party's position as xenophobic, anti-immigrant and Islamophobic. With especially strong criticism of Vox's harsh position against vulnerable immigrant groups, such as unaccompanied minors, refugees or victims of crime in their country of origin.

The party is critical of multiculturalism and demographic transition, supporting natalist politics and opposing replacement migration.

There are persons of non-European descent among Vox members and supporters. Notable figures of African descent associated with the party include Ignacio Garriga and Bertrand Ndongo.

Environment 
The party's discourse about the environment has evolved over time, going from climate change denial to a conservationist approach. However, the party still opposes the mainstream environmental views, labelling them as "Green religion", and as recent as April 2021 voted against the Law for Climate Change and Energy Transition, which was adopted anyway.

Education 
Vox promotes the "pin parental" policy: changes in laws aimed to guarantee the rights of parents to control public education of their children, and veto their children from obligatory attendance to classes contradicting values of parents. Party representatives claim that Spanish national and regional authorities abuse the control of the public education system to impose their political and ideological agenda on children.

Foreign policy and international relations

Europe 
Since its formation, Vox was close to Matteo Salvini's Lega Nord party in Italy. In March 2021, Salvini said there were no longer any links between the two parties, with Vox growing closer to Giorgia Meloni's Brothers of Italy party instead. A member of the European Conservatives and Reformists, Vox shares group with parties such as Polish Law and Justice, Brothers of Italy, Dutch JA21 or the Sweden Democrats.

Vox holds a Eurosceptic view of the European Union, arguing that Spain should make no sovereignty concessions to the EU, because according to the Constitution of Spain national sovereignty is vested in the Spanish people, from whom emanate the powers of the State. The party's leadership is strongly opposed to the EU becoming a federal superstate and instead argues for a Europe of "strong and sovereign states" that "defends its borders and its Christian roots and opposes multiculturalism and mass immigration." Political science professor Andrés Santana and Lisa Zanotti noted that out of all the parties in Spain, Vox's voters and grassroots activists were the most likely to oppose Spain's membership of the EU.

In July 2021, party leader Abascal signed a statement about Europe's future that opposed the EU's "federalist drift" with Viktor Orbán (Prime Minister of Hungary and president of Fidesz), Marine Le Pen (President of the National Rally), Jarosław Kaczyński (leader of PiS and ex-Prime Minister of Poland), Giorgia Meloni, among others.

Following the beginning of the  2022 Russian invasion of Ukraine Vox  took a strong pro-Ukrainian stance, announcing its support to "all measures" to defend Ukraine, including shipments of armaments to Ukraine.

Americas 
Vox was supportive of Donald Trump and his political ideals during his presidency and met with his government in February 2019 to present the Madrid Charter; the document divided political groups in the Americas into the two sides of Western democracies and "criminal" left-wing groups that were "under the umbrella of the Cuban regime". The Madrid Charter called for scholars and the media to adopt and disseminate the ideas of the document. In September 2021, 15 senators and three deputies from the National Action Party of Mexico met Abascal to sign the charter. The charter was primarily signed by Venezuelan opposition members, Cuban dissidents and Fujimorists from Peru, with El País writing that Vox gathered groups of Evangelicals, Catholics, neoconservatives, right-wing populists and individuals "nostalgic for military dictatorships" to sign the document.

Voter profile 
A 2020 study based on a statistical analysis of April 2019 general election results found that Vox's support is stronger among middle-aged, urban population with higher secondary education and at the higher end of income distribution. Authors say that such voter profile is in direct contrast with that of a typical supporter of radical right parties in other European states, expected to be a man from a rural area with low education and low income. Vox's support is stronger among electorate dissatisfied with the current political situation in Spain, and voters who identify themselves as Spaniards.

A 2021 study of the influence of Spanish party leaders on Twitter during the April 2019 general election campaign found that the messages tweeted during the electoral campaign by Santiago Abascal (Vox) reached the highest diffusion and viralization capacity compared to Twitter messages by leaders of Cs, PSOE, PP and UP. The main focus of Abascal's tweets, according to the authors, was Spanish territorial model (27.2%), government and parties (19.3%) and economy (14.5%).

Electoral performance

Cortes Generales

European Parliament

Regional parliaments

Results timeline

Party membership 
According to the party's annual reports.

See also
A list of notable Vox politicians
History of the far-right in Spain

Notes

References

Bibliography

External links

 Official site

 
Political schisms
Anti-communist parties
Anti-immigration politics in Europe
Anti-Islam political parties in Europe
Anti-Islam sentiment in Spain
Right-wing populist parties
Spanish nationalism
2013 establishments in Spain
Political parties established in 2013
Conservative parties in Spain
Far-right political parties in Spain
National conservative parties
Neoliberal parties
Monarchist parties in Spain
Opposition to same-sex marriage
Right-wing populism in Spain
Right-wing parties in Europe
Social conservative parties